FC Kempten is German association football club based in Kempten, Bavaria.

History
The team was established in 1903 as the football department of gymnastics club Männerturnvereins Kempten. In 1907 the parent association merged with two other local gymnastics clubs to form Turnverein 1856 Kempten and on 21 September 1908 the footballers went their own way as an independent side known as Fußball Club Kempten. The footballers briefly re-joined TV in 1923, but resumed their independence two years later.

Following World War II FC Kempten played in the Amateurliga Bayern-Süd (III) between 1957 and 1963 where they earned mid-table results. As a result of league restructuring in 1963 they slipped to fourth-tier play in the Landesliga Bayern-Süd. Over the next several decades Kempten played as an unremarked side in fourth- and fifth-tier competition. In 1999 the club emerged as the champions of the Landesliga Süd (V) and won promotion to the Bayernliga (IV) for a two season long turn. They won their way back to the Bayernliga in 2005, finishing second in the Landesliga, and were immediately relegated, but have returned for the 2007–08 campaign, when a last place finish in the Bayernliga meant relegation once more. In 2008–09, the club declined further, suffering relegation to the Bezirksoberliga, followed by relegation to the Bezirksliga in 2010. The team dropped to a new low for the 2011–12 season with its relegation to the Kreisliga Schwaben-Süd after a loss in the relegation play-off. They had to stay at this level for only one season before a Kreisliga championship took it back up a level, back to the Bezirksliga, from where it was relegated again straight away. It took out another Kreisliga championship in 2015 and returned to the Bezirksliga but was yet again relegated after just one season.

FC Kempten plays its home matches in the Illerstadion, opened on 15 August 1963. After renovations in 2000 the facility has a capacity of 9,000 spectators (720 seats).

Rivals
The TSV Kottern is FC Kempten's biggest local rival, being also based in the town of Kempten. They last faced each other in the Landesliga Bayern-Süd in the 2006–07 season, when both games ended in draws, 1–1 and 2–2. In the Schwaben Cup however, Kottern gained the upper hand, defeating the FC 6–5 on penalties after a 2–2 draw after normal time.

Honours
The club's honours:

League
 2nd Amateurliga Schwaben (IV)
 Champions: (5) 1949, 1951, 1952, 1956, 1957
 Landesliga Bayern-Süd (V)
 Champions: (2) 1999, 2007
 Runners-up: 2005
 Bezirksoberliga Schwaben
 Runners-up: (2) 1994, 1997
 Bezirksliga Schwaben-Süd
 Champions: (4) 1970, 1982, 1987, 2018
 Kreisliga Schwaben-Süd
 Champions: 2013, 2015
 Runners-up: 2011, 2017

Cup
 Schwaben Cup
 Winners: (3) 1963, 1985, 1987
 Runners-up: (2) 1962, 1995

Indoor
 Schwaben indoor championship
 Winners: (2) 2000, 2005

Recent seasons
The recent season-by-season performance of the club:

With the introduction of the Bezirksoberligas in 1988 as the new fifth tier, below the Landesligas, all leagues below dropped one tier. With the introduction of the Regionalligas in 1994 and the 3. Liga in 2008 as the new third tier, below the 2. Bundesliga, all leagues below dropped one tier. With the establishment of the Regionalliga Bayern as the new fourth tier in Bavaria in 2012 the Bayernliga was split into a northern and a southern division, the number of Landesligas expanded from three to five and the Bezirksoberligas abolished. All leagues from the Bezirksligas onwards were elevated one tier.

References

Sources
Grüne, Hardy (2001). Vereinslexikon. Kassel: AGON Sportverlag

External links
 Official team site
 FC Kempten at Weltfussball.de
 Das deutsche Fußball-Archiv historical German domestic league tables (in German)

Football clubs in Germany
Football clubs in Bavaria
Association football clubs established in 1907
Kempten
Football in Swabia (Bavaria)
1907 establishments in Germany